Oleg Bodrug (born 23 February 1965, Chișinău) is a Moldovan politician, vice-president of the Parliament of the Republic of Moldova, co-chair of the Liberal Reformist Party.

Biography 
Oleg Bodrug was born on 23 February 1965 in the city of Chisinau. He graduated from the Faculty of Physics at the State University of Moldova and the Polytechnic Institute of St. Petersburg. Oleg Bodrug is a member of Union of Journalists of Moldova and has been the director of "Prut Internaţional" Publishing house since 1992. He has been a member of the Parliament of Moldova since 2009. From 21 August 2010 to 13 April 2013 - Secretary General of the Liberal Party (PL).  He joined the Liberal Party Reform Council in 2013. From 30 May 2013 - Deputy Speaker of the Parliament of the Republic of Moldova. 

In the April 2009 Moldovan parliamentary electionApril 2009 elections, Oleg Bodrug is elected a deputy in the Parliament of the Republic of Moldova, reelected in July 2009 and 2010.

On 12 April 2013 Oleg Bodrug joined the Council of the Liberal Reformist Party, demanding replacing Mihai Ghimpu with Dorin Chirtoacă at the head of the Liberal Party.

On 13 April 2013 Oleg Bogrug has been excluded from the Liberal Party by the Republican Council of the Liberal Party.

On 15 December 2013, at the Congress of Constitution of the Liberal Reformist Party, Oleg Bodrug was elected co-chairman of the Liberal Reformist Party.

Family
Oleg Bodrug is married and has two children.

External links 
 Oleg Bodrug. Un editor pentru aristocraţii scrisului
 Site-ul Parlamentului Republicii Moldova
 Site-ul Partidului Liberal

References

Romanian people of Moldovan descent
1965 births
Living people
Moldova State University alumni
Peter the Great St. Petersburg Polytechnic University alumni
Moldovan journalists
Male journalists
Liberal Party (Moldova) MPs
Moldovan MPs 2009–2010
Moldovan MPs 2009
Romanian Popular Party politicians

Recipients of the Order of Honour (Moldova)